The Columbus Jets were a Minor League baseball team that played in Columbus, Ohio, from 1955 to 1970. The team moved from Ottawa, Ontario, Canada where they were known as the Ottawa Athletics. The Jets were a member of the Triple-A International League.

The Jets' name came from Columbus' role in manufacturing aircraft by North American Aviation for World War II.

They were the Triple-A affiliate of the Kansas City Athletics (1955–56) and Pittsburgh Pirates (1957–70). The Jets played their home games at Jets Stadium.

In 1971 the franchise moved to Charleston, West Virginia, and became the Charleston Charlies, leaving Columbus without organized baseball for the first time since 1894. In 1977 the Columbus Clippers returned baseball to Ohio's capital.

Notable alumni

Steve Arlin
Steve Blass
Donn Clendenon
Dock Ellis
Johnny Lipon
Bob Kuzava
Julián Javier
Román Mejías
Pat Gillick
Manny Mota
Gene Michael
Richie Hebner
Milt May
Al Oliver
Freddie Patek
Dave Roberts
Manny Sanguillén
Billy Shantz
Willie Stargell
Bob Veale
Frank Verdi
Wilbur Wood

Yearly record

References

Defunct International League teams
Pittsburgh Pirates minor league affiliates
Kansas City Athletics minor league affiliates
Professional baseball teams in Ohio
Defunct baseball teams in Ohio
Baseball teams in Columbus, Ohio
1955 establishments in Ohio
Baseball teams disestablished in 1970
Baseball teams established in 1955